The Syrian–Mount Lebanon Relief Committee was an organization "formed in June of 1916 under the chairmanship of Najib Maalouf and the Assistant Chairmanship of Ameen Rihani" in the United States. Kahlil Gibran was its secretary. Its offices were at 55 Broadway, New York. It aimed at working in cooperation with the American Committee for Armenian and Syrian Relief, and raised "some $165,815 in two and a half years from about 15,000 Syrian subscribers in America."

See also
Great Famine of Mount Lebanon

References

Organizations established in 1916
Humanitarian aid organizations of World War I
Philanthropic organizations based in the United States